Ross Molony (11 May 1994) is an Irish professional rugby union player, who plays in the second-row position for Irish province Leinster.

Club career
While in the academy for the 2015–16 season he nonetheless featured and impressed in the senior team, earning his first full professional contract from the 2016–17 season. He previously represented Leinster at underage level. Molony was given the man of the match award in his European Champions' Cup debut in Leinster's 25–11 home win over Bath Rugby.

International career
He previously played for the Ireland national under-20 rugby union team in the Junior World Championship and u-20 Six Nations tournaments. In June 2021 he was called up to the senior Ireland squad for the Summer tests.

References

External links
Leinster Profile
Pro14 Profile

1994 births
Living people
People educated at St Michael's College, Dublin
Rugby union players from Dublin (city)
Irish rugby union players
Leinster Rugby players
Rugby union locks